Eupterote amaena is a moth in the family Eupterotidae. It was described by Francis Walker in 1855. It is found on Java and Sumatra.

The larvae feed on Vitex, Piper, Erythrina and Dioscorea species.

References

Moths described in 1855
Eupterotinae